Umesh Singh Kushwaha is a Former Member of Legislative Assembly in Bihar from Mahnar constituency. He is a member of Janata Dal (United). Kushwaha is the son of Vasudev Singh and hails from Kajri Bujurg village in the Vaishali district of Bihar. He studied at Acharya Narendra Dev College Shahpur Patori, Lalit Narayan Mithila University. Besides being a politician he is also active in business and is a share holder in Lord Budhha food product private ltd. He is the current Bihar state President of Janata Dal (United).

Political career
Umesh Kushwaha represents the Mahnar constituency of the Bihar, which came into existence once again after the delimitation exercise of 2008. In 1957, Banarasi Devi a candidate from Indian National Congress represented this constituency but after its revival in 2008 the seat has been a stronghold of National Democratic Alliance. In 2010 Legislative Assembly Elections when Janata Dal (United) was a member of National Democratic Alliance, Dr. Achyutanand of Bharatiya Janata Party contested and won the seat but he was defeated by Kushwaha in the 2015 Elections with a large difference of 27,000 votes. Kushwaha was then a candidate of Mahagathbandhan (Grand Alliance) which included Rashtriya Janata Dal and Janata Dal (United). Later the Grand Alliance was broken due to differences between the two major political parties. In 2020 Assembly Election to Bihar Legislative Assembly JD(U) again made its candidate from the Mahnar seat.

Umesh lost the 2020 Assembly elections to Veena Devi, the wife of RJD strongman Rama Kishor Singh. The anti-incumbency situation in the state against ruling JD (U) and the step taken by Chirag Paswan to weaken JD (U) by placing its candidates against it and not against BJP resulted in defeat of a large number of sitting MLAs of JD (U).

In January 2021, Kushwaha was appointed to the post of Bihar state president of Janata Dal (United) following the resignation of Bashishtha Narayan Singh on health grounds. The party's step was speculated to be a result of a move to revive its decaying old social coalition which needed  revival after the poor performance of JD(U) in Bihar Assembly election 2020.

Controversies
Kushwaha has been involved in many controversies and has faced public criticism many times. In one such incident while he was to lay the foundation of a road construction project in the Baghchauna-Lavapur, a village falling within his constituency he was hooted by the locals to the extent that he had to postpone his plan quickly.  In 2018, the Block head of Rashtriya Lok Samata Party for Jandaha, Manish Sahani was gunned down by unidentified gunmen. In the FIR the case was lodged against nine persons in which Kushwaha was made the prime accused. In 2019 the a car registered under the name of Kushwaha allegedly thrashed two bikers in which both died. While the JD (U) leader claimed that it was not owned by him the incident followed widespread protest by the kins of the victims near JD (U) office at Patna.

References

External links
पीटे गए JDU विधायक: लोगों ने मंगा 5 साल का हिसाब, नहीं बता पाए तो हुआ कांड
वैशाली में प्रमुख हत्याकांड में जदयू विधायक समेत दस पर गिरफ्तारी का वारंट 
महनार के जेडीयू विधायक जनता के बीच फंसे मुश्किल में, समर्थकों के साथ भिड़े स्थानीय लोग
JDU विधायक से लोग बोले- 5 साल का हिसाब दो, नहीं बता पाए तो समर्थकों से हाथापाई

Janata Dal (United) politicians
Living people
Year of birth missing (living people)
Bihar MLAs 2015–2020
Criminals from Bihar